The Czermak–Hering test is a vagal maneuver consisting of the application of external digital pressure to the carotid sinus. The test is performed at the patient's bedside by imposing moderate pressure with the fingers, repeatedly massaging  the left or the right carotid arteries.

Effects
The Czermak–Hering test is a test for  autonomic nervous function (vasovagal response), exerting:
 Bradycardia
 Hypotension
 Decrease of blood flow in the brachial artery
 Alterations in the blood flow in the internal carotid artery.

Physiology
Johann Nepomuk Czermak stated that mechanical compression of the carotid artery due to the carotid sinus reflex initiates a stimulus of the heart inhibitory branches of the vagus nerve.

See also
Carotid sinus massage

References

Medical tests
Vagus nerve